Stazione FS is a station of the Brescia Metro, in the city of Brescia in northern Italy. It is located beside the Brescia railway station near the city centre and close to long distance and local bus stations.

Because of its location as an interchange between many of Brescia's public transport systems, it is the largest and best equipped station on the subway line and has been designed in anticipation of a large flow of passengers.

References

External links

Brescia Metro stations
Railway stations opened in 2013
2013 establishments in Italy
Railway stations in Italy opened in the 21st century